Lincoln Roberts (born 4 September 1974) is a former cricketer who played one Test match for West Indies and 51 first class games for Trinidad and Tobago.

Roberts made his first class debut in 1996 after impressive one day form. It took until 1999 for him to score his maiden first class century, a month later he made his Test debut against Australia despite a first class average of 22. He made a seven ball duck, and took no wickets or catches in the match, but he did make history in becoming the first player from the island of Tobago to play Test cricket.

This was to be his only Test match but he continued to appear for Trinidad and Tobago on a regular basis. In 2003 despite averaging in the mid thirties he was released and his cricket career ended at the age of 29.

References

External links

1974 births
Living people
Trinidad and Tobago cricketers
West Indies Test cricketers
Herefordshire cricketers
People from Tobago
Trinidad and Tobago expatriates in England
Tobagonian cricketers